Riama is a genus of lizards in the family Gymnophthalmidae. The genus is endemic to South America.

Species
The genus Riama contains 15 species which are recognized as being valid.
Riama anatoloros 
Riama balneator 
Riama cashcaensis  – Kizorian's lightbulb lizard
Riama colomaromani 
Riama columbiana  – Colombian lightbulb lizard
Riama inanis 
Riama labionis 
Riama meleagris  – brown lightbulb lizard
Riama orcesi 
Riama raneyi 
Riama simotera  – O'Shaughnessy's lightbulb lizard
Riama stigmatoral 
Riama striata  – striped lightbulb lizard,
Riama unicolor  – drab lightbulb lizard
Riama yumborum 

Nota bene: A binomial authority in parentheses indicates that the species was originally described in a genus other than Riama.

References

Further reading
Gray JE (1858). "Description of Riama, a New Genus of Lizards, forming a distinct Family". Annals and Magazine of Natural History, Third Series 1858: 444–446. (Riama, new genus, p. 445; R. unicolor, new species, p. 446 + Plate XV, figure 2).

 
Lizards of South America
Taxa named by John Edward Gray